Northup is an unincorporated community in Gallia County, in the U.S. state of Ohio.

History
A post office called Northup was established in 1858. The community was named after John S. Northup, founder.

References

Unincorporated communities in Gallia County, Ohio